State Road 960 (SR 960), locally known as Northwest 14th Street, is a  east–west street adjacent to Miami International Airport in western Miami-Dade County, Florida. The easternmost segment between the route's eastern terminus and Northwest 37th Avenue is one way westbound. The road runs parallel to the Dolphin Expressway. The designation was created in 2014 as part of a jurisdictional swap over various roadways between the Florida Department of Transportation (FDOT) and the City of Miami.

Route description

SR 960 begins at the foot of the Dolphin Expressway exit off-ramp serving Northwest 37th Avenue/Douglas Road. Between these two points, the road runs one way westward. SR 960 then passes underneath two overhead exit ramps, one of which serves Miami International Airport from the Dolphin Expressway, and intersects LeJeune Road (SR 953). After passing underneath the Northwest 12th Drive bridge, the route comes to an abrupt end at Northwest 42nd Court.

History
SR 960 was created as a condition by FDOT in order to transfer a segment of Brickell Avenue that once carried US Highway 1 (US 1) to the City of Miami. In exchange, the city transferred Northwest 14th Street, as well as Northwest 6th Avenue & Northwest 6th Court (SR 925), over to FDOT.

Major intersections

References

External links

960
960